Remotely Operated Auto Racers (formerly known as Radio Operated Auto Racing), abbreviated as ROAR, is the sanctioning body of competitive radio-controlled car racing in the United States and Canada. It is a US national non profit organization that promotes the sport of radio controlled model car racing.

History
ROAR was originally organized in 1967 By George Siposs and Norb Meyers and a small group of people dedicated to forming competitive Radio Controlled Car Racing and was the first organization in the world to sanction competitive Model Car Racing. In 1968 the first ROAR National Championship race was held at Sunset Ford car dealership in Garden Grove, California using 1/8th scale nitro pan cars. ROAR has steadily grown and evolved as the sport has grown. ROAR is the oldest sanctioning body in the world.

ROAR is one of four affiliated blocs that form the International Federation of Model Auto Racing (IFMAR). ROAR is one of four votes of approval of rules and regulations for IFMAR and is the only organization in the United States and Canada that can qualify drivers to participate in the IFMAR World Championships. ROAR publishes a yearly rule book that governs most forms of electric and fuel R/C racing in the U.S. and Canada and is widely used by tracks as the competitive racing standard. ROAR sanctions club racing, Region races and select events such as the Winternats, Great Lakes Challenge, Texas Biggie, etc. Each year ROAR holds a Championship to determine a National Champion for select classes. ROAR is a non-profit organization that provides insurance for racing participants, spectators and facilities. Steve Pond was elected ROAR president in 2015.

Purpose 
The governing body of ROAR is the executive committee. This committee consists of an elected president and vice president, and five appointed members.   Additionally, two section chairpersons join the executive committee as non-voting members and organize their advisory groups of racers for recommendations and communication with the other members of the team.  The executive committee controls and manages the business affairs of ROAR, and ensures that the rules are up to date. The day-to-day business of the corporation is handled by the ROAR administrator, a non-voting member of the executive committee.
 
ROAR rules have been the guidelines for R/C car racing for over 50 years. They are designed to promote fair competition, safety, and define what equipment can be used in ROAR competition. ROAR does not manage races below national level (Level 5), but it does sanction races from the club level to multi-regional championships. All ROAR members in current and good standing are eligible to enter these races.
 
ROAR is the North American representative to the International Federation of Model Auto Racing (IFMAR). As such, ROAR is the only organization that is authorized to qualify and send drivers to the IFMAR World Championships. More ROAR members have been crowned World Champion than from any other organization.
 
The strength of ROAR is in the local clubs. It is here that the weekly competition takes place allowing drivers to perfect their skills, and prepare themselves to compete at the State, Region, and National level. ROAR has 200 clubs in the US and Canada. These clubs pay only $35 per year to be sanctioned, and to be covered by the member accident and liability insurance.

Events
The 2010 fuel nationals were held in Lincoln, Nebraska at HobbyTown USA R/C Raceway Park.

Regions 

ROAR is made up of 12 regions in the United States plus Canada. Each region has a director nominated and elected by the members in the region. This gives the members someone they can communicate with directly regarding issues in the region, and within ROAR.

Region 1: Connecticut – Maine – Massachusetts – New Hampshire – New York – Rhode Island – Vermont

Region 2: Delaware – Maryland – New Jersey – Pennsylvania – Washington DC – Virginia – West Virginia

Region 3: Alabama – Georgia – North Carolina – South Carolina – Tennessee

Region 4: Florida

Region 5: Illinois – Indiana – Kentucky – Michigan – Ohio – Wisconsin

Region 6: Arkansas – Louisiana – Mississippi

Region 7: Minnesota – North Dakota – South Dakota

Region 8: Iowa – Kansas – Missouri – Nebraska

Region 9: Oklahoma – Texas

Region 10: Arizona – Colorado – New Mexico – Utah – Wyoming

Region 11: Idaho – Montana – Oregon – Washington – Alaska

Region 12: California – Hawaii – Nevada

Region Canada: Canada

Current ROAR Member IFMAR World Champions

2019 1/10 Electric 2wd Buggy Spencer Rivkin

Previous ROAR Member IFMAR World Champions

2017 1/10 Electric 2wd Buggy Ryan Maifield 

2015 1/10 Electric 4wd Buggy Ryan Maifield 

2015 1/10 Electric 2wd Buggy Spencer Rivkin 

2014 1/8 Nitro Buggy Ty Tessman 

2013 1/10 Electric 2wd Buggy Jared Tebo 

2013 1/10 Electric 4wd Buggy Steven Hartson 

2011 1/10 Electric 4wd Buggy Ryan Cavalieri 

2011 1/10 Electric 2wd Buggy Ryan Cavalieri 

2010 1/10 200mm IC Touring Ralph Burch 

2010 1/8 IC Offroad Cody King 

2007 1/10 Electric Offroad 4wd Jared Tebo 

2006 1/8 IC Offroad Mark Pavidis 

2005 1/10 Electric Offroad 4wd Ryan Cavalieri 

2003 1/10 Electric Offroad 2wd Billy Easton 

2003 1/10 Electric Offroad 4wd Ryan Cavalieri 

2002 1/8 IC Offroad Greg Degani 

2002 1/10 IC Track 235mm TC Brian Berry 

2002 1/10 200mm IC Touring Mark Pavidis 

2001 1/10 Electric Offroad 2wd Matt Francis 

1997 1/10 Electric Offroad 2wd Brian Kinwald 

1996 1/10 Electric Offroad 2wd  Chris Bing 

1996 1/10 Electric Track Pro 10 Mike Swauger 

1995 1/10 Electric Offroad 2wd Matt Francis 

1995 1/10 Electric Offroad 4wd Mark Pavidis 

1993 1/10 Electric Offroad 2wd Brian Kinwald 

1992 1/10 Electric Track Pro 10 Joel Johnson 

1992 1/12 Electric Track Modified Tony Neisinger 

1991 1/10 Electric Offroad 4wd Cliff Lett 

1990 1/12 Electric Track Modified Chris Doseck 

1987 1/8 Sport IC Track Pete Fusco 

1987 1/10 Electric Offroad 2wd Joel Johnson 

1986 1/12 Electric Track Modified Tony Neisinger 

1985 1/10 Electric Offroad Modified Gil Losi Jr 

1985 1/10 Electric Offroad Stock Jay Halsey 

1984 1/12 Electric Track Modified Tony Neisinger 

1984 1/12 Electric Track Stock  Bud Bartos 

1982 1/12 Electric Track Modified Arturo Carbonell 

1982 1/12 Electric Track Stock Kent Clausen 

1981 1/8 Sport IC Track Arturo Carbonell 

1977 1/8 Sport IC Track Butch Kroells

References

External links 
 ROAR website
IFMAR

Radio-controlled car racing organizations
Sports governing bodies in North America